Phemeranthus (fameflower) is a genus of flowering plants in the miner's lettuce family, Montiaceae, native to the Americas. It is sometimes placed in Portulacaceae. The name is derived from the Greek words εφήμερος (ephemeros), meaning "living for one day," and ἄνθος (anthos), meaning "flower." Common names for the various species are often fame flower, rock rose, rock pink, and sand pink.

Selected species
Phemeranthus brevicaulis (S.Watson) Kiger – Dwarf fameflower
Phemeranthus brevifolius (Torr.) Hershk. – Pygmy fameflower
Phemeranthus calcaricus (Ware) Kiger – Limestone fameflower
Phemeranthus calycinus (Engelm.) Kiger – Largeflower fameflower
Phemeranthus confertiflorus (Greene) Hershk. – New Mexico fameflower
Phemeranthus humilis (Greene) Kiger – Pinos Altos fameflower
Phemeranthus longipes (Woot. & Standl.) Kiger – Pink fameflower
Phemeranthus marginatus (Greene) Kiger – Tepic fameflower
Phemeranthus mengesii (W.Wolf) Kiger – Menges' fameflower
Phemeranthus parviflorus (Nutt.) Kiger – Sunbright
Phemeranthus piedmontanus Ware – Piedmont fameflower
Phemeranthus rhizomatus D.J.Ferguson – Gila fameflower
Phemeranthus rugospermus (Holz.) Kiger – Prairie fameflower
Phemeranthus sediformis (Poelln.) Kiger – Okanogan fameflower
Phemeranthus spinescens (Torr.) Hershk. – Spiny fameflower
Phemeranthus teretifolius (Pursh) Raf. – Quill fameflower
Phemeranthus thompsonii (N.D.Atwood & S.L.Welsh) Kiger – Cedar Mountain fameflower [synonym of P. valudulus]
Phemeranthus validulus (Greene) Kiger – Tusayan Fameflower

References

External links

Caryophyllales genera
Montiaceae
Taxa named by Constantine Samuel Rafinesque